Tommy Talton (born January 9, 1949) is an American guitarist who is most noted for having played with Cowboy, Gregg Allman, and numerous recording sessions with Paul Butterfield, Allman Brothers Band, Bonnie Bramlett, Clarence Carter, Corky Laing, Billy Joe Shaver, Dickey Betts, Kitty Wells, Martin Mull, Johnny Rivers, and We the People. He has released six solo albums from 2005 to the present; In Europe : Someone Else's Shoes, Live Notes From Athens, Let's Get Outta Here, Until After Then, Somewhere South of Eden and Distant Light (Live Acoustic) plus Live At The NuttHouse, a collaborative album with his Cowboy co-leader Scott Boyer.

Biography
In the 1950s, Tommy Talton was exposed to the music of Elvis Presley. When he was eight, Talton became interested in the guitar when he saw an instrument owned by one of his uncles and plucked one of the strings. Talton ultimately learned to play the instrument when he was 13. In 1966, Talton joined We the People, and left the group when he was 18. In 1969, Talton met up with Scott Boyer, Chuck Leavell, and Bill Stewart in California and formed the band Cowboy. Talton had been close friends with guitarist Duane Allman and went on to play with Gregg Allman on his first tour as a solo artist, as well as acoustic guitar on the Allman Brothers Band song "Pony Boy" on their album, Brothers and Sisters. Talton also made an appearance on Dickey Betts' Highway Call.

More recently, Talton relocated to reside in Luxembourg.

References

1949 births
Living people
American country singer-songwriters
Capricorn Records artists
American blues guitarists
American male guitarists
American Southern Rock musicians
20th-century American guitarists
20th-century American male musicians
Cowboy (band) members
American male singer-songwriters